The Cape Lookout Lighthouse is a 163-foot-high lighthouse located on the southern Outer Banks of North Carolina. It flashes every 15 seconds and is visible at least 12 miles out to sea and up to 19 miles. It is one of the very few lighthouses that operate during the day. It became fully automated in 1950. The Cape Lookout Lighthouse is the only such structure in the United States to bear the checkered daymark, intended not only for differentiation between similar light towers, but also to show direction. The center of the black diamonds points in a north-south direction, while the center of the white diamonds points east-west.

History

It is the second lighthouse that has stood at this location, and is nearly identical to the Bodie Island Lighthouse, which has horizontal stripes, and the Currituck Beach Lighthouse, which is unpainted red brick. The more famous Cape Hatteras Lighthouse bears spiral stripes. The first lighthouse at Cape Lookout was completed and lit in 1812 at a cost of more than $20,000, which Congress authorized in 1804. It took eight years to build. It was the fourth lighthouse to be built in North Carolina and was a 96-foot-high brick tower with wooden shingles painted with red and white horizontal stripes. However, it proved to be too short to light the treacherous Lookout Shoals, which were nicknamed the "Horrible Headland."

The present lighthouse was completed and lit on November 1, 1859 at a cost of $45,000, which Congress approved in 1857. This lighthouse used a first-order Fresnel lens which allowed the light to shine brighter. On May 20, 1861, North Carolina joined the Confederacy and all of the lenses were removed from the coastal lighthouses and navigational beacons to prevent Union forces from using the lights to navigate the coast. Union troops captured the nearby Beaufort and Morehead City in 1862 and, by the end of the next year, a third-order Fresnel lens was installed in the Cape Lookout lighthouse. On April 2, 1864, a small group of Confederate troops under the command of L.C. Harland snuck through Union lines and out to the lighthouse. Their attempt to blow up the lighthouse was unsuccessful, however the explosion did destroy the lighthouse oil supply and damaged the iron stairs. With iron unavailable during the war, the damaged sections of the stairs were replaced by wooden ones. The Fresnel lenses from all the North Carolina lighthouses were found in 1865 in Raleigh. The lenses were shipped back to their original manufacturers to be checked out and repaired. In 1867, the temporary wooden stairs were replaced when iron once again became available after the war and the original first-order Fresnel lens was reinstalled.

In 1873, the lighthouse was painted in its distinctive black and white diagonal checkerboard, or diamond, pattern. There are those who believe the Cape Hatteras Light and the Cape Lookout Light paint schemes were reversed. This belief arose since the Cape Hatteras Light protects ships from Diamond Shoals and should therefore have the diamond pattern. However, the daymark patterns were randomly assigned and there is no evidence to suggest that the Cape Lookout and Cape Hatteras patterns were switched. Diamond City, a community that once stood on the eastern end of Shackleford Banks, was named after the daymark pattern on the nearby Cape Lookout Lighthouse.

The lighthouse is part of the Cape Lookout National Seashore and can only be accessed by private ferry. During the summer, the Cape Lookout Light Station Visitor Center and Keepers' Quarters Museum are open. Though tower climbs were suspended in February 2008, the lighthouse opened for climbing permanently July 15, 2010. The regular season lasts from mid-May to mid-September each year. During the open season, visitors are allowed to climb the 207 steps to the top of the lighthouse.

On March 26, 2021, it was announced that The Cape Lookout Lighthouse would be closed to climbing by the public due to safety concerns. During a pre-season safety inspection conducted in January, officials found what they call serious concerns with the flooring, rails, as well as separations between the iron stairs and masonry, cracks in the iron landing plates and separation from the iron stairs and central support. The Cape Lookout Lighthouse Keepers Quarters Museum located near the base of the lighthouse remains open and the National Park Service expects repairs to be completed by 2025.

Timeline

Gallery

References

External links

 Cape Lookout National Seashore
 Cape Lookout on CarolinaLights.com
 Cape Lookout: Cape Lookout Lighthouse: Cape Lookout National Seashore, North Carolina National Park Service

Lighthouses on the National Register of Historic Places in North Carolina
Lighthouses completed in 1857
Buildings and structures in Carteret County, North Carolina
Outer Banks
Tourist attractions in Carteret County, North Carolina
National Register of Historic Places in Carteret County, North Carolina
1857 establishments in North Carolina